The Benaleka train accident occurred on August 1, 2007 near Benaleka in the Democratic Republic of Congo, killing at least 100 people and seriously injuring 128 more.

The crash was caused by the failure of the train's brakes. Eight cars derailed; many of those killed had been riding on the roofs and were trapped underneath. The driver was able to detach the locomotive and go for help. Many of the injured were carried by bicycle or even on the backs of others to the nearest hospital, six miles away.

It is one of the deadliest rail accidents on the African continent.

References

Railway accidents in 2007
Derailments in the Democratic Republic of the Congo
Runaway train disasters
Kasai-Occidental
2007 in the Democratic Republic of the Congo
August 2007 events in Africa
Kasaï-Central